Andriy Fedorovych Misyaylo (born 24 March 1988) is a Ukrainian football midfielder currently playing for Ukrainian Second League club Hirnyk-Sport.

Club history
Andriy Misyaylo began his football career in Shakhtar Youth in Donetsk. He signed with FC Kremin Kremenchuk during 2009 winter transfer window.

Career statistics

Honours
Ukraine national team
 Football at the 2007 Summer Universiade: Champion
 Football at the 2009 Summer Universiade: Champion

References

External links

  Profile – Official Kremin site
  FC Kremin Kremenchuk Squad on the PFL website
  Profile on the FFU website
 Profile on Football Squads

1988 births
Living people
People from Kurakhove
Ukrainian footballers
FC Illichivets-2 Mariupol players
FC Vorskla Poltava players
FC Kremin Kremenchuk players
FC Hirnyk-Sport Horishni Plavni players
FC Karlivka players
FC Nikopol players
Association football midfielders
Universiade gold medalists for Ukraine
Universiade medalists in football
Medalists at the 2007 Summer Universiade
Sportspeople from Donetsk Oblast